The AT&T Building (formerly the South Central Bell Building and BellSouth Building, also colloquially known as the Batman Building) is a , 33-story skyscraper completed in September 1994 and located in Nashville, Tennessee. The structure is designed as an office tower capable of housing 2,000 workers. It is currently the tallest building in the state of Tennessee.

Architecture and design
It features a three-story winter garden atrium as its foyer and has a nine-story underground parking garage with 1,300 vehicle capacity. Its distinctive design and dark coloration have earned it the nickname "Batman Building", due to its resemblance to the cowl of superhero character Batman.

Richard Miller, the president of architectural firm Earl Swensson Associates, said of the design process: "...at the time we did that  wanted a signature piece of architecture. What happens inside the building drives the way the outside looks."

In August 2009, the French online business journal Le Journal du Net named the iconic "Batman Building", or as the article names it "La tour de Batman", one of the 12 most original office buildings in the world.

In 2011, a drawing of the AT&T Building – alongside images of iconic structures from Tennessee's three other large cities (the Memphis Pyramid, Knoxville's Sunsphere, and the Tennessee Aquarium of Chattanooga) – was incorporated into the standard design of Tennessee's state-issued driver's licenses.

Tenants
AT&T, previously BellSouth Telecommunications and before that South Central Bell, has operated its Tennessee headquarters out of the building since it was opened in 1994. AT&T held a 23.5 year lease ending in January 2020, which was renewed for an undisclosed period of time in March 2019. Nissan North America operated a temporary headquarters in the remainder of office area, twelve floors, for two years before relocating to a permanent location in Franklin, Tennessee, in mid-2008. Other notable tenants that have held space include Hankook Tire America and U.S. Bank.

Local television station WTVF Channel 5, while not utilizing office space, operates two live remotely controlled video cameras mounted on the western spire, which were established in 1995 and 1996. These cameras are used to provide scenic views of Nashville and assist in covering news events.

Ownership
After completion in 1994, the AT&T Building was purchased by Prefco XIV L.P., a limited partnership of the Pitney Bowes Real Estate Financing Corp, for US$100.8 million. Ownership of the building was transferred to Cerberus Capital Management subsidiary EntreCap Financial in July 2006 after Cerberus acquired Prefco. The building was immediately placed back on the market for resell, and in mid-2007 was sold to MTL Leasing LLC for an undisclosed sum.

See also
 List of tallest buildings in Nashville
 List of tallest buildings by U.S. state and territory

References

External links

 AT&T Building at Glass, Steel, and Stone
 AT&T Building at Emporis

Building (Nashville)
Postmodern architecture in the United States
Skyscraper office buildings in Nashville, Tennessee
Office buildings completed in 1994
1994 establishments in Tennessee